"I Really Want to Stay at Your House" is a song by British singer Rosa Walton written for the 2020 video game Cyberpunk 2077. Featured in the fictional radio station 98.7 Body Heat Radio, the song was included by Lakeshore Records on the soundtrack album Cyberpunk 2077: Radio, Vol. 2 (Original Soundtrack), which was released on 18 December 2020. The song would later on go viral in 2022 after being utilised heavily in the 2022 cyberpunk anime series Cyberpunk: Edgerunners and chart in the United Kingdom at number 68.

Music video
A music video for the song was released on 3 October 2022. The clip was edited by Nicholas Fung and features a compilation of scenes from throughout the Cyberpunk: Edgerunners anime series which highlight the romantic relationship of the characters David Martinez and Lucyna Kushinada.

Chart performance
After its inclusion in the anime series Cyberpunk: Edgerunners in 2022, the song charted at number 68 on the UK Singles Chart.

Charts

Notes

References

External links
 
 

Cyberpunk (role-playing game)
2020 songs
Love themes
Songs written for video games